This is a timeline documenting events of Jazz in the year 2001.

Events

January

 25 – The 4th Polarjazz started in Longyearbyen, Svalbard (January 25 – 28).

February

March

April
 6
 The 28th Vossajazz started at Voss, Norway (April 6 – 8).
 Stein Inge Brækhus was awarded Vossajazzprisen 2003.
 3 – Eldbjørg Raknes performs the commissioned work So much depends upon a red wheel barrow for Vossajazz 2003.

May
 23 – The 29th Nattjazz 2001 started in Bergen, Norway (May 23 – June 2).

June
 1 – The 30th Moers Festival started in Moers, Germany (June 1 – 4).
 19 – The 13th Jazz Fest Wien started in Vienna, Austria (June 19 – July 8).
 26 – The 18th Stockholm Jazz Festival started in Stockholm, Sweden (June 26 – July 22).
 29 – The 22nd Montreal International Jazz Festival started in Montreal, Quebec, Canada (June 29 - July 10).

July
 6 – The 35th Montreux Jazz Festival started in Montreux, Switzerland (July 6 – 22).
 13 – The 26th North Sea Jazz Festival started in The Hague, Netherlands (July 13 – 15).
 14 – The 36th Pori Jazz Festival started in Pori, Finland (July 14 – 22).
 16 – The 41st Moldejazz started in Molde, Norway (July 16 – 21).
 21 – The 54th Nice Jazz Festival started in Nice, France (July 21 – 28).
 24 – The 36th San Sebastian Jazz Festival started in San Sebastian, Spain (July 24 – 29).

August
 6 – The 16th Oslo Jazzfestival started in Oslo, Norway (August 6–12).
 8 – The 15th Sildajazz started in Haugesund, Norway (August 8 – 12).
 10
 The 47th Newport Jazz Festival started in Newport, Rhode Island (August 10 – 12).
 The 19th Brecon Jazz Festival started in Brecon, Wales (August 10 – 12).

September
 21 – The 44th Monterey Jazz Festival started in Monterey, California (September 21 – 23).

October
 11 – The DølaJazz started in Lillehammer, Norway (Oktober 11 - 14).

November
 8 – The Trondheim Jazz Festival started in Trondheim, Norway (November 8 – 11).
 9 – The 10th London Jazz Festival started in London, England (November 9 – 18).

December

Albums released

January

February

March

April

May

June

July

August

September

October

November

December

Unknown date
#

B
 Michael Brecker: Nearness Of You: The Ballad Book (Verve)

C
 Marilyn Crispell: Blue (Black Saint)

G
 Gordon Goodwin's Big Phat Band: Swingin' For The Fences (Silverline)

H
 Herbie Hancock: Future 2 Future (Transparent, Columbia)
 Gordon Haskell: Look Out (Flying Sparks)

K
 Olga Konkova Trio: Some Things From Home (Candid)
 Diana Krall: The Look of Love (Verve)

M
 James Morrison: Scream Machine (Morrison Records)

S
 Matthew Shipp: Expansion Power Release (hatOLOGY)

T
 The Idea of North: The Sum of Us (Magnetic Records)

W
 Robbie Williams: Swing When You're Winning (Capitol ) More Easy Listening Style
 World Saxophone Quartet: 25th Anniversary: The New Chapter (Justin Time)

Deaths

 January
 4 – Les Brown, American bandleader (born 1912).
 13 – Stan Freeman, American composer, lyricist, musical arranger, conductor, and pianist (born 1920).
 17 – Norris Turney, American flautist and saxophonist (born 1921).
 23
 Jack McDuff, American organist and organ trio bandleader (born 1926).
 Lou Levy, American pianist (born 1928).

 February
 4 – J. J. Johnson, American trombonist, composer, and arranger (born 1924).
 10 – Buddy Tate, American saxophonist and clarinetist (born 1913).
 13
 George T. Simon, American writer and drummer (born 1912).
 Moses Taiwa Molelekwa, South African pianist (born 1973).

 March
 7 – Frankie Carle, American pianist and bandleader (born 1903).
 18 – Rupert Nurse, Trinidadian-British pianist, upright bassist, and saxophonist (born 1910).
 19 – Herbie Jones, American trumpeter and arranger (born 1926).
 20 – Jay Cameron, American baritone saxophonist and reedist (born 1928).
 28 – Moe Koffman, Canadian saxophonist, flautist, composer, and arranger (born 1928).
 29 – John Lewis, American pianist, composer and arranger (born 1920).

 April
 5 – Sonya Hedenbratt, Swedish singer and actress (born 1931).
 9 – Ken Rattenbury, English trumpeter, pianist, composer, and author (born 1920).
 18 – Billy Mitchell, American tenor saxophonist (born 1926).
 24 – Al Hibbler, American baritone singer, Duke Ellington Orchestra (born 1915).

 May
 3 – Billy Higgins, American drummer (born 1936).
 19 – Susannah McCorkle, American singer (born 1946).
 22 – Lorez Alexandria, American singer (born 1929).
 27 – Glauco Masetti, Italian jazz reedist (born 1922).

 June
 13 – Makanda Ken McIntyre, American musician and composer (born 1931).
 19 – Lindsay L. Cooper, Scottish upright bass, electric bass and cello player (born 1940).
 30
 Chet Atkins, American guitarist, songwriter, and record producer (born 1924).
 Joe Henderson, American tenor saxophonist (born 1937).

 July
 27 – Harold Land, American hard bop and post-bop tenor saxophonist (born 1928).

  August
 6 – Larry Adler, American harmonica player (born 1914).
 17 – Flip Phillips, American tenor saxophonist and clarinetist (born 1915).
 23 – Eric Allandale, Dominican-English trombonist, songwriter, and bandleader (born 1936).
 27 – Cal Collins, American guitarist (born 1933).

 September
 1 – Sil Austin, American saxophonist (born 1929).
 2 – Jay Migliori, American saxophonist (born 1930).

 October
 2 – Manny Albam, American baritone saxophonist, composer, arranger, producer, and educator (born 1922).
 4 – John Collins, American guitarist (born 1913).
 11 – Billy Maxted, American pianist (born 1917).
 16 – Etta Jones, American singer (born 1928).
 29 – Spike Robinson, American tenor saxophonist (born 1930).
 31 – Bill Le Sage, British pianist, vibraphonist, arranger, composer, and bandleader (born 1927).

 November
 13
 Babik Reinhardt, French jazz guitarist (born 1944).
 Panama Francis, American drummer (born 1918).
 16 – Tommy Flanagan, American jazz pianist and composer (born 1930).
 21 – Ralph Burns, American pianist, composer, and arranger (born 1922).

 December
 14 – Conte Candoli, American trumpeter (born 1927).
 22 – Gene Taylor, American upright bassist (born 1929).
 30 – Ralph Sutton, American pianist (born 1922).

 Unknown date
 David Batey, English pianist (born 1939)
 Oliver Todd, American band leader, organist, pianist, and trumpeter (born 1916).

Births

 August
 30 – Emily Bear, American composer and pianist.

See also

 2000s in jazz
 List of years in jazz
 2001 in music

References

External links 
 History Of Jazz Timeline: 2001 at All About Jazz

2000s in jazz
Jazz